David or Dave Mitchell may refer to:

Entertainment
 David Mitchell (author) (born 1969), English novelist
 David Mitchell (comedian) (born 1974), British actor and comedian
 David Mitchell (Irish actor) (born 1973), Irish actor
 David Mitchell (New Zealand poet) (1940-2011), New Zealand poet
 David Robert Mitchell (born 1974), American film director
 David V. Mitchell (born 1943), American editor and publisher
 Dave B. Mitchell (born 1969), American voice actor and musician

Politics
 David Mitchell (politician) (1928–2014), British Conservative Member of Parliament
 David Brydie Mitchell (1760–1837), governor of Georgia (U.S.)

Sports

Football
David Mitchell (Australian rules footballer) (born 1964), former Australian rules footballer
David Mitchell (footballer, born 1866) (1866–1948), Scottish international football player
David Mitchell (footballer, born 1945), English football player
David Mitchell (footballer, born 1990), Scottish football goalkeeper (Stranraer, Dundee)
Dave Mitchell (soccer) (born 1962), Scottish-born Australian footballer and coach

Other sports
David Mitchell (canoeist) (born 1943), former British slalom canoeist 
David Mitchell (cricketer) (born 1980), English cricketer
David Mitchell (field hockey) (born 1981), Scottish field hockey defender
David Mitchell (fighter) (born 1979), American mixed martial artist
David Mitchell (figure skater) (born 1982), American ice dancer
David Mitchell (lacrosse) (born 1984), Canadian lacrosse player

Other
 David Mitchell (architect) (1941–2018), New Zealand architect
 David Mitchell (builder) (1829–1916), Scottish-Australian builder
 David Mitchell (lawyer) (1934–2018), Australian Presbyterian minister and former solicitor-general of Lesotho
 David Mitchell (murderer) (1972–2000), Bahamian murderer executed for his crimes
 David Mitchell (Royal Navy officer) (c. 1642–1710), Scottish admiral
 David B. Mitchell (police officer) (born 1950), American police chief from Maryland and Delaware
 David J. Mitchell (born 1954), Canadian historian
 David Scott Mitchell (1836–1907), Australian founder of the Mitchell Library in Sydney Australia
 David William Mitchell (1813–1859), English zoologist and illustrator

See also
David Mitchel (died 1663), Scottish bishop